A bass guitar or simply bass is a plucked string instrument in the guitar family of stringed instruments.  They can be electric bass or acoustic bass.  In many genres, it has largely replaced the double bass.  As with its electric guitar and acoustic guitar counterparts, music from the mid-20th century has led to various instrument manufacturers producing signature models that are endorsed by an artist.

A

B

C

D

E

F

G

H

I

J

K

L

M

N

O

P

Q

R

S

T

U

V

W

X

Y

Z

See also
List of guitars
List of signature model guitars

References

bass guitar